Fuller Theological Seminary  is an interdenominational Evangelical Christian seminary in Pasadena, California, with regional campuses in the western United States. It is egalitarian in nature.

Fuller consistently has a student body that comprises over 4,000 students from 90 countries and 110 denominations. There are over 41,000 alumni Fuller is broadly evangelical among faculty and student body. Some hold conservative evangelical views such as unlimited inerrancy while others hold liberal evangelical sentiments such as limited inerrancy which views the Bible as true on matters of salvation but contains error in its recording of history and science.

History
Fuller Theological Seminary was founded in 1947 by Charles E. Fuller, a radio evangelist known for his Old Fashioned Revival Hour show, and Harold Ockenga, the pastor of Park Street Church in Boston. The seminary's founders sought to reform fundamentalism's separatist and sometimes anti-intellectual stance during the 1920s–1940s. Fuller envisaged that the seminary would become "a Caltech of the evangelical world."

The earliest faculty held theologically and socially conservative views, though professors with liberal perspectives arrived in the 1960s and 1970s. There were tensions in the late 1950s and early 1960s as some faculty members became uncomfortable with staff and students who did not agree with Biblical inerrancy. This led to people associated with the seminary playing a role in the rise of neo-evangelicalism and progressive theology.

David Hubbard recruited Donald McGavran to be the first dean of the newly created school of world mission in 1965. McGavran was esteemed as perhaps the world’s most prominent and influential missiologist of the 20th century. McGavran recruited some of the greatest missiologist of the 20th century to serve as faculty of the school of world mission at Fuller Theological Seminary. This included Alan Tippett, Ralph Winter, C. Peter Wagner and many others. These faculty would shape world missions for the ensuing decades. Fuller’s School of World Mission became the largest missions training institution in the world. The school of world mission also has the largest amount of missions faculty of any institution in the world as well as graduating the most missions students of any seminary.

In 2019, it had 2,672 students enrolled.

Presidents
Fuller has had five presidents over its over 70-year history. The founding president, Harold Ockenga, remained in Boston and served as president in absentia from 1947 to 1954. He described his role to Charles Fuller as recruiting faculty and setting the curriculum, which did not require his active presence in Pasadena. His successor and protege Edward John Carnell, a Baptist theologian and apologist, took over the post in 1954 but resigned in 1959 under failing health. Ockenga resumed his in absentia leadership until 35-year-old David Allen Hubbard, a Baptist Old Testament scholar and member of Fuller's third entering class, became Fuller's third president in 1963. Hubbard served for 30 years and led the seminary through both substantial growth and significant controversy.

Hubbard was succeeded by Reformed philosopher and theologian Richard Mouw, who served as president of Fuller from 1993 to 2013. In 2006, a Los Angeles Times article labeled him as "one of the nation's leading evangelicals". In July 2013, Mark Labberton became the Clifford L. Penner Presidential Chair of Fuller. Labberton, a Presbyterian (USA) pastor, had previously served Fuller as director of the Lloyd John Ogilvie Institute of Preaching since 2009. He retains his position as Lloyd John Ogilvie Associate Professor of Preaching alongside the presidency. Mouw remained at Fuller as Professor of Faith and Public Life until 2020. In October 2021, Labberton announced his retirement.

Fuller has announced that David Goatley will become the next president. He is the first African American to occupy the role. David is a missions executive and former administrative executive at Duke University.

Academics
Fuller is accredited by the Association of Theological Schools in the United States and Canada and the Western Association of Schools and Colleges. Fuller's student body of 2,897 includes students from 90 countries and 110 denominational backgrounds.

Fuller Theological Seminary is organized into schools of theology, psychology, and intercultural studies. The seminary emphasizes integration between the three schools and many students take courses in more than one school. The seminary offers 18 degree programs, including seven master's degrees and 11 advanced degrees.

Campuses
Fuller closed Fuller Northwest (Seattle), Fuller Bay Area (Menlo Park), and Fuller Orange County (Irvine).  It also reduced degree programs offered in Fuller Colorado (Colorado Springs) and Fuller Arizona (Phoenix). These closures and reductions took place before the 2019–20 academic year.

In 2018, Fuller briefly planned to sell its main campus in Pasadena and move to Pomona. In October 2019 the board of directors voted to cancel the move and remain in Pasadena, citing dramatically escalated costs of construction in Southern California and differences with the City of Pasadena, which affected the sale and sale price of the seminary’s Pasadena campus.

Fuller currently has campuses in Pasadena, California, Phoenix, Arizona, and Houston, Texas. The Phoenix and Houston campuses are called Fuller Arizona and Fuller Texas, respectively.

Social issues 
While Fuller has established policies, the seminary is open to difference in opinion among students and faculty. The seminary's current president, Mark Labberton, marched in favor of comprehensive immigration reform and a pathway to citizenship for undocumented immigrants in 2013. Others have expressed support in the Fuller forum for the Black Lives Matter movement as raising awareness for civil rights. In 2015, some faculty at the seminary called on Christians to openly discuss, with respect, issues related to race, gender, sexual orientation, refugees, and immigrants.

The student club OneTable is the first LGBTQ group organized within an evangelical seminary. In 2021, three LGBTQ former Fuller students joined the class-action lawsuit Elizabeth Hunter et al. vs. U.S. Department of Education, arguing that religious exemptions that allow religious institutions of higher education to discriminate on the basis of sexual orientation or gender identity violate the Constitution. According to Fuller's Community Standards, the seminary does not discriminate on the basis of gender identity and "Fuller Theological Seminary also does not discriminate on the basis of sexual orientation. The seminary does lawfully discriminate on the basis of sexual conduct that violates its biblically based Community Standard Statement on Sexual Standards."

Awards and prizes 
Fuller annually awards the David Allan Hubbard Achievement Award to a graduating student from each of Seminary’s three schools, in recognition of outstanding work completed while at Fuller. The award was instituted in honor of David Allan Hubbard, an Old Testament scholar, and the third President of Fuller Theological Seminary. Each recipient is chosen by the faculty of their respective school.

See also
List of Fuller Theological Seminary people

References

External links

 
Educational institutions established in 1947
Schools accredited by the Western Association of Schools and Colleges
Evangelicalism in California
Interdenominational seminaries and theological colleges
Seminaries and theological colleges in California
Education in Pasadena, California
1947 establishments in California